Olivier Vliegen (born 7 February 1999) is a Belgian footballer who plays as a goalkeeper for FC Slovan Liberec in the Czech First League.

Career 
After failing to make an appearance for Anderlecht, Belgium's most successful club, Vliegen trialed unsuccessfully with Sparta Prague, the most successful Czech team, before signing for Slovan Liberec in the Czech First League. He mostly appeared in the team's B squad in initial season. In 2020 he was loaned to Vlašim in the Czech National Football League.

In February 2021, he signed a half-season loan with Senica of the Slovak Fortuna Liga.

References

External links 
 Olivier Vliegen at Soccerway

1999 births
Living people
Belgian footballers
Belgian expatriate footballers
Association football goalkeepers
FC Slovan Liberec players
FC Sellier & Bellot Vlašim players
FK Senica players
Bohemian Football League players
Czech National Football League players
Expatriate footballers in the Czech Republic
Belgian expatriate sportspeople in the Czech Republic
Expatriate footballers in Slovakia
Belgian expatriate sportspeople in Slovakia
People from Bree, Belgium
Footballers from Limburg (Belgium)